Benjamin or Ben Pierce may refer to:

 Benjamin Pierce (governor) (1757–1839), governor of New Hampshire in the 1820s, father of U.S. President Franklin Pierce
 Benjamin Pierce (1841–1853), the last surviving son of U.S. President Franklin Pierce; died in a train accident just before his father's inauguration
 Benjamin C. Pierce (born 1963), American professor of computer science
 Benjamin Kendrick Pierce (1790–1850), U.S. Army officer in the Seminole Wars and brother of U.S. President Franklin Pierce, namesake of Fort Pierce, Florida
 Ben J. Pierce (born 1999), American YouTuber, singer-songwriter, and actor

Fiction
 Benjamin Franklin "Hawkeye" Pierce (mostly known as Hawkeye Pierce), fictional character in the M*A*S*H film and television series
 Benjamin Pierce, fictional schizophrenic artist in the David Cronenberg film Scanners

See also
 Benjamin Peirce (disambiguation)
 Benjamin Pearse (1832–1902), Canadian public servant
 Ben Pearce, English DJ and producer based in Manchester
 Benjamin W. Pearce (1816–1870), American politician